Panagiotis V. Faklaris (Greek: Παναγιώτης Β. Φάκλαρης) is a Greek archaeologist, professor of classical archaeology and excavator of the acropolis and the walls of Vergina. 
Main fields of specialization: topography of ancient Macedonia, topography of ancient Kynouria, arms and armour, horse harnesses, ancient Greek daily life, metal finds, Greek mythology. 
Studied archaeology at the Aristotle University of Thessaloniki and the University of Cambridge UK. 
Born in Arcadia, Greece, April 1947. 
Assistant (1978–1992) of the famous Greek archaeology professor Manolis Andronikos. 
Member of the Athens Archaeological Society since 1986.
Member of the Greek Folklore Society since 1977. 
Founding member of the Association for the Study of Ancient Greek Technology (EMAET).EMAET
Member of the Historical and Epigraphical Studies Society. 
Member of the Peloponnesian Studies Society. Εταιρεία Πελοποννησιακών Σπουδών
Founding member of the Arcadian Academy.

In 1993 he received the award of the Academy of Athens for his book Αρχαία Κυνουρία. Ανθρώπινη δραστηριότητα και περιβάλλον. (Ancient Kynouria. Human Activity and Environment).
Since 1985, Panagiotis Faklaris has been teaching most subjects of classical archaeology at the Department of Archaeology of the Aristotle University in Thessaloniki, Greece.

He has written numerous scholarly papers in international archaeological journals and a number of books. 
His major contribution is the determination of the location of the first capital of Macedonia (Aegae) near the "Gardens of Midas" on the slopes of Mount Vermion vermio Mountains. Aegae was formerly believed to be in modern Vergina.
Participated at a large number of Greek and international archaeological congresses. Director of research programs at the Aristotle University. Lectured at universities and  institutes in several countries. Received honors, awards and medals from numerous associations and institutions. A frequent columnist in the Sunday Press of Athens.

Bibliography
1. Χέλυς (Chelys). ArchDelt  32 (1977): Μελέτες,  218–233.

2. Πήλινες μήτρες, σφραγίδες και ανάγλυφα αγγεία από τη Βεργίνα (Clay moulds, Stamps and Relief Vases from Vergina). ArchDelt 38 (1983): Μελέτες, 211–238.

3. Αρχαία Κυνουρία. Ανθρώπινη δραστηριότητα και περιβάλλον (Ancient Kynouria. Human Activity and Environment), Thessaloniki 1985 (doctoral dissertation). Second edition published by the Ministry of Culture, 1990.

4.Περιτραχήλιον (Gorget-Peritrachelion). ArchDelt 40 (1985): Μελέτες, 1–16.

5. Αμαξιτοί δρόμοι της αρχαίας Κυνουρίας  (Carriageways of ancient Kynouria). Proceedings of the 3rd International Conference of Peloponnesian Studies (Kalamata, September 8–15/1985), Πελοποννησιακά Παράρτ. 13, (1987/88) 155–159.

6. Οι δεσμώτες της Ακάνθου (The fettered men of Acanthus). ΑΑΑ 19 (1986) 178–184.

7.Ιπποσκευές από τη Βεργίνα (Harnesses from Vergina). ArchDelt 41 (1986): Μελέτες 1–57.

8.Ταφή πρώιμης εποχής του σιδήρου στη Βεργίνα (An Early Iron Age Burial from Vergina). Αμητός, Studies in honor of Professor M. Andronikos, Thessaloniki 1987, 923–933.

9.Η μάχη της Θυρέας (546 π.Χ.). Το πρόβλημα του προσδιορισμού του πεδίου της μάχης (The Battle of Thyrea. Determining the site of the Battlefield). ΗΟΡΟΣ 5 (1987) 101–118.

10.Μια μαρτυρία για τον ενταφιασμό του Αθαν. Διάκου (Evidence about the Burial of Athanassios Diakos). Φθιωτικά Χρονικά, 1987, 85–88.

11. Το Παλιόχανο της Κυνουρίας (Paliochano of Kynouria), Ιστορικογεωγραφικά 2 (1987–1988) 145–150.

12.Αγιονόρι. Αρχαία χρόνια (Aghionori in antiquity). Ιστορικογεωγραφικά 2 (1988) 227–231 (in collaboration with E.Kourinou-Pikoula and G. Pikoulas).

13.Ο λαϊκός γλύπτης Κων. Γκαύρος (The folk sculptor K. Gavros). Σύνδειπνον, Studies in honor of Professor D.S. Loukatos (1988) 285–293.http://www.vervena.net/

14. Οικισμός προϊστορικών χρόνων στη Λεπτή Ορεστιάδος (The pre-historic selltlement of Lepti, Orestias). Θρακική Επετηρίς 7 (1987–1990) 145–157 (in collaboration with G.Kourtesi-Philippaki).

15.Ο οχυρωτικός περίβολος και η ακρόπολη της Βεργίνας. Τα πρώτα ανασκαφικά δεδομένα. (The walls and the acropolis of Vergina. First excavational evidence)  Αρχαία Μακεδονία V, vol. 1, Thessaloniki 1993, 391–396.

16. Κάλυμμα ασπίδος ή ασπίς; (Shield cover or aspis?) Φηγός, Studies in honor of Professor S. Dakaris, Ioannina 1994, 137–148.

17. 

18.Εργαστήρια στην ακρόπολη της Βεργίνας (Workshops on the acropolis of Verghina). Ancient Greek Technology. Proceedings of the 1st International Conference September 1997, Thessaloniki 1998, 193–200.

19.Η ελιά και το λάδι στην αρχαία Ελλάδα (The olive tree and olive oil in ancient Greece), Η ελιά και το λάδι από την αρχαιότητα έως σήμερα, International conference proceedings, The Academy of Athens, October 1–2, 1999 (Athens 2003) 33–47 (in collaboration with V. Stamatopoulou).

20.Ελαιοτρόπιον. Οι ελληνικές ονομασίες των επί μέρους στοιχείων μιας ελληνικής εφεύρεσης (Elaiotropion-trapetum. The Greek terms for the components of a Greek invention), Η ελιά και το λάδι στον χώρο και τον χρόνο, Symposium proceedings, Preveza, November 24–26, 2000 (Athens 2003) 35–44.

21. Και άλλα προβλήματα του τάφου ΙΙ της Βεργίνας: το μέγεθος και οι φάσεις κατασκευής του (Some more problems of the Tomb II at Vergina: its  size and phases of construction), in Valavanis P. (ed.),  Taxidevontas stin Klassiki ellada, Papers in Honor of Professor Petros Themelis, Athens 2011, 345–368.

Excavations
-Thessaloniki: the Roman cemetery at Melenikou St.; the Galerian building cluster)

-Derveni: the Hellenistic cemetery

-Pella: the north city wall and the so-called “Baths of Alexander”

-Chalkidiki: the Doric temple of Ammon Zeus

-Participation in the excavation at Bassae as a member of the Research Team of the Apollo Epikourios temple in 1976, 1977, 1978.

-In 1981 conducted excavations at Paralio Astros and Xeropegado, Kynouria.

-Since 1978 he has been working at the University Excavation of Vergina, where he participated in the excavation of the Great Tumulus, under the direction of Professor M. Andronikos, having excavated at the “Heroon”, at Tomb I, Tomb II and discovered and excavated the unplundered Tomb III and some graves of commoners also buried under the Great Tumulus. In 1980 he excavated parts of the ancient city located in modern Vergina and in 1981 he undertook the excavation of the acropolis and the city walls, which he has been conducting ever since, on behalf of the Aristotle University. Students of Archaeology are trained by Pan. Faklaris and his team in these excavations every year.

Projects
-Publication of the armour and arms found in the unplundered Tombs II and III of the Verghina Great Tumulus, currently in preparation.

-Publication of the construction of the Great Tumulus.

-Publication of Tomb III of the Great Tumulus and its contents.

-Publication of the weapons, armour, tools and pottery found in the sanctuary of Apollo Epikourios in Bassae, Arcadia.

-Publication of metal finds, especially weapons, tools and harnesses from several other Greek archaeological sites.

-Publication of the excavation of the acropolis and the walls of Verghina.

References

External links
Home page at the Aristotle University 

Vergina: Acropolis and wall.  http://history-of-macedonia.com/wordpress/2010/03/10/anakalufthikan-ta-teixi-tis-verginas/ http://www.sparta.markoulakispublications.org.uk/index.php?id=285

Ο ατομικός οπλισμός. Η υπεροχή των αμυντικών και επιθετίκών όπλων των αρχαίων Ελλήνων. Η ΚΑΘΗΜΕΡΙΝΗ, ΕΠΤΑ ΗΜΕΡΕΣ 4/1/1998

Ο τάφος του Φιλίππου. Όνειρα κι αλήθειες. ΤΟ ΒΗΜΑ 30/08/1998

Ο ευλογημένος καρπός της αρχαίας Ελλάδας. ΤΟ ΒΗΜΑ 31/01/1999

Το μυστικό του τύμβου. ΤΟ ΒΗΜΑ 25/04/1999

Το φρούριο της Βεργίνας.ΤΟ ΒΗΜΑ 06/06/1999

Αι αφύαι, ο θεόπαις λάβραξ και ο ορφώς. ΤΟ ΒΗΜΑ 18/07/1999

Άμπελον ευρεθήναι εν Ολυμπία. Η ΚΑΘΗΜΕΡΙΝΗ 29/08/1999.pdf

Οι σεισμοί της αρχαιότητας και ο ενοσίχθων Ποσειδών. ΤΟ ΒΗΜΑ 12/12/1999

Η χαμένη έπαυλη του Ηρώδη Αττικού. ΤΟ ΒΗΜΑ 13/02/2000

Οι πηγές των πετρελαιοειδών. ΤΟ ΒΗΜΑ 13/02/2000

Η θλίψη του βασιλιά Φιλίππου Β'. ΤΟ ΒΗΜΑ 23/07/2000

Η πρόκληση της μη ανέγερσης ή το χρέος της ανέγερσης;ΤΟ ΒΗΜΑ 30/07/2000

Γιατί χρειάζεται μουσείο Βεργίνας. ΤΟ ΒΗΜΑ 11/02/2001

Ο ερευνητής του παρελθόντος και η κοινή γνώμη. ΤΟ ΒΗΜΑ 27/10/2002

Ο κόθορνος, ο άνεμος και ο Εύριπος στην πολιτική. ΤΟ ΒΗΜΑ 15/02/2004

Άγρα, θήρα, κυνηγέσιον. ΤΟ ΒΗΜΑ 28/03/2004

Τα ελληνικά μουσεία στον ιστό της αράχνης. ΤΟ ΒΗΜΑ 29/05/2005

Greek archaeologists
Aristotle University of Thessaloniki alumni
Living people
Year of birth missing (living people)
Academic staff of the Aristotle University of Thessaloniki
People from North Kynouria